West Odessa is an unincorporated area and census-designated place (CDP) in Ector County, Texas, United States, on the west side of the city of Odessa. The population was 22,707 at the 2010 census, up from 17,799 at the 2000 census. It is part of the Odessa metropolitan area.

Geography
West Odessa is located at  (31.841978, -102.482744), occupying the center of Ector County. It is bordered to the south by Interstate 20, to the north by Texas State Highway 302, to the west by FM 866, and to the east by the city of Odessa. Exits 104, 108, 112, and 113 from I-20 serve the community.

Demographics

2020 census

As of the 2020 United States census, there were 33,340 people, 7,885 households, and 5,422 families residing in the CDP.

2010 census
As of the census of 2010, there were 22,707 people, 5,742 households, and 4,656 families residing in the CDP. The population density was 285.0 people per square mile (110.0/km2). There were 6,393 housing units at an average density of 102.4/sq mi (39.5/km2). The racial makeup of the CDP was 71.64% White, 0.74% African American, 1.08% Native American, 0.09% Asian, 0.06% Pacific Islander, 23.88% from other races, and 2.51% from two or more races. Hispanic or Latino of any race were 48.05% of the population.

There were 5,742 households, out of which 45.0% had children under the age of 18 living with them, 65.7% were married couples living together, 10.4% had a female householder with no husband present, and 18.9% were non-families. 16.0% of all households were made up of individuals, and 5.5% had someone living alone who was 65 years of age or older. The average household size was 3.09 and the average family size was 3.46.

In the CDP, the population was spread out, with 33.1% under the age of 18, 10.0% from 18 to 24, 28.7% from 25 to 44, 20.5% from 45 to 64, and 7.7% who were 65 years of age or older. The median age was 30 years. For every 100 females, there were 99.6 males. For every 100 females age 18 and over, there were 97.8 males.

The median income for a household in the CDP was $31,277, and the median income for a family was $33,817. Males had a median income of $29,443 versus $19,450 for females. The per capita income for the CDP was $11,907. About 17.5% of families and 19.9% of the population were below the poverty line, including 24.6% of those under age 18 and 16.7% of those age 65 or over.

Education
West Odessa is served by the Ector County Independent School District.

References

Census-designated places in Ector County, Texas
Census-designated places in Texas
Census-designated places in Midland–Odessa